Amsterdam Avenue may refer to:

Tenth Avenue (Manhattan), New York City, U.S.
Amsterdam Avenue (Mexico City), Mexico